Mohsen Mohamed Farahvash Fashandi (born 21 July 1947) is a retired Iranian featherweight freestyle wrestler. He won a world title in 1973 and a gold medal at the 1974 Asian Games. He placed fourth at the 1976 Summer Olympics.

Farahvashi married Ms. Sharifi in November 1974 in Tehran. He has a brother and a sister.

References

External links 
 

1947 births
Living people
Olympic wrestlers of Iran
Wrestlers at the 1976 Summer Olympics
Iranian male sport wrestlers
Asian Games gold medalists for Iran
Asian Games medalists in wrestling
Wrestlers at the 1974 Asian Games
Medalists at the 1974 Asian Games
World Wrestling Champions
20th-century Iranian people
21st-century Iranian people